Esokone Secondary School is a small, public secondary school located in Kakamega County, Kenya. The school was officially opened on July 20, 2007, by Benjamin Ngorge, the Commissioner of the Kakamega South District. The school has approximately 50 students and 4 classrooms, two of which were recently constructed and financed by a group of American high school students. Esokone Secondary School is a Mixed Day Only school. The schools sponsorship is listed as Religious Organization. The School Institution Type is classified as – Ordinary. 

The closest villages to Esokone are Shibuli and Bukura, and the closest urban area is Kakamega.

High schools and secondary schools in Kenya
Education in Western Province (Kenya)
Educational institutions established in 2007
2007 establishments in Kenya
Kakamega County